Ruqaiyyah Waris Maqsood, (born Rosalyn Rushbrook in 1942, later Rosalyn Kendrick) is a British author of some forty books on Islam and other subjects.

Biography

Maqsood was born in London in 1942. She graduated from the University of Hull in 1963 with an honours degree in Christian Theology, and gained a DipEd in 1964. Maqsood was a convert to Islam from Christianity in 1986. She taught religious studies in the United Kingdom for more than thirty years. Prior to her retirement in 1996, she had been head of religious education at a Hull secondary school.

She has written more than forty books on religious topics. Under her first married name Rosalyn Kendrick, she wrote several books about aspects of Christian theology. From 1992, she published a large body of writing to introduce Islam to English speaking people. Her book for children, Islamic Mosques (2005), includes information about mosques and how to pronounce Islamic terms. Need to Know?: Islam (2008) was considered a contemporary "Tablīgh" by Insights.

Bibliography

References 

English Muslims
English former Christians
Converts to Islam from Protestantism
20th-century Muslim scholars of Islam
1942 births
Living people
British scholars of Islam
Women scholars of Islam
Former Protestants